Albert Edward Booth (28 May 1928 – 6 February 2010) was a British left-wing Labour Party politician and cabinet minister.

Early life
Booth was educated at Marine School, South Shields and Rutherford College of Technology (Northumbria University). He was a design draughtsman. He served as a councillor on Tynemouth Council 1962–65.

Parliamentary career
Booth contested Tynemouth in 1964. He was Member of Parliament for Barrow-in-Furness from 1966 to 1983, and was Secretary of State for Employment from 1976 to 1979 serving under James Callaghan. He also acted as the Labour Party's national Treasurer between 1983–1984.

After boundary changes, his seat was renamed Barrow and Furness, for the 1983 General Election but despite a 1979 majority of 7,741 he lost it to the Conservative Cecil Franks. This has often been attributed to Labour's unilateralist policy of nuclear disarmament, and Booth himself identified with that, leading a CND march through his constituency. However, his constituents were reliant on the defence industries, particularly shipbuilding, and this led to one of Labour's most unexpected defeats of the election. However, a campaign against him centred in a local Catholic church, highlighting his record of voting in favour of women's right to choose to have an abortion, was also a significant factor. (Religiously Booth was a lay preacher in the Methodist Church.)

Later life
Booth made it through to the final round in the Labour selection for Sunderland South ahead of the 1987 election, but lost out by four votes to Chris Mullin. He unsuccessfully  contested Warrington South in 1987.

References

Times Guide to the House of Commons, 1966 & 1983

External links
 
 Albert Booth – Daily Telegraph obituary
 Albert Booth 1928–2010: an "Old Labour" man – Workers' Liberty obituary by his niece, Janine Booth

|-

|-

1928 births
2010 deaths
Alumni of Northumbria University
British Secretaries of State for Employment
Councillors in Tyne and Wear
Labour Party (UK) MPs for English constituencies
UK MPs 1966–1970
UK MPs 1970–1974
UK MPs 1974
UK MPs 1974–1979
UK MPs 1979–1983
Members of the Privy Council of the United Kingdom
Technical, Administrative and Supervisory Section-sponsored MPs